Luce is an unincorporated community in Otter Tail County, in the U.S. state of Minnesota.

History
Luce was platted in 1884 on the Northern Pacific Railroad. A post office was established at Luce in 1883, and remained in operation until it was discontinued in 1948.

References

Former municipalities in Minnesota
Unincorporated communities in Otter Tail County, Minnesota
Unincorporated communities in Minnesota